The 2009–10 Milwaukee Panthers men's basketball represented the University of Wisconsin–Milwaukee during the 2009–10 college basketball season. They were led by head coach Rob Jeter. The Panthers competed in the Horizon League and played their home games at US Cellular Arena. They finished the season 20–14, 10–8 in Horizon play and lost in the semifinals of the 2010 Horizon League men's basketball tournament.

Recruits 
The following is a list of commitments Milwaukee received for the 2009-2010 season:
 Ja'Rob McCallum (Guard)
 Lonnie Boga (Guard)
 Michael Tyler (Forward)
 Quinton Gustavson (Forward)
 Mitchell Carter (Center)
 Christian Wolf (Forward)

Roster

Coaching staff

Schedule

2010 Horizon League tournament 

First round games at campus sites of lower-numbered seeds
Second round, semifinals, and championship were hosted by the #1 Overall Seed, Butler.
All times ET.

References 

Milwaukee
Milwaukee Panthers men's basketball seasons